Alone is a 2020 American thriller film directed by John Hyams, from a screenplay by Mattias Olsson. The film stars Jules Willcox as a young woman who desperately tries to escape a homicidal stalker (Marc Menchaca) in the wilderness. It was released in the United States on September 18, 2020, by Magnet Releasing.

Plot
Jessica (Jules Willcox), a recent widow, is moving. During her drive, she keeps encountering a mysterious man (Marc Menchaca) in several places: on the highway, at a gas station, a motel, a rest stop, then ultimately when she crashes her car, due to her tire being slashed. He drugs her, then takes her to his cabin where he locks her in the basement.

Jessica wakes up and pleads with the man for her release. He alludes to her not being the first one he's taken and then he forces her to tell him what happened to her husband. She reveals that her husband killed himself using a gun. The next morning, she hears the man leaving and notices that the key is still in the keyhole on the other side. She slides her sweater underneath the door and uses a stray nail to push the key out. She frees herself and hides in an upstairs closet when the man comes back. She overhears him speaking to his wife and daughter on the phone, lying about where he is and that he'll be back soon. Once he goes downstairs, she flees outside.

The man realizes what has happened and a chase ensues. She injures her foot and they face off at the river, where she jumps in to escape. Injured, wet, and cold, she stumbles through the forest until she hears rustling in the bush. Thinking the man has found her, she hides behind a tree and hits someone in the chest with a branch. Instead of the man, she hits a man named Robert (Anthony Heald) who is out hunting. After a tense conversation in which he has his rifle pointed at her, he offers her his phone to call for help. However, the blow with the branch had broken it. He then helps her to his car and offers her food, water, and his wife's hiking boots as she is barefoot. As they are driving, they come to a stop where a tree has fallen, blocking the road. As they get out of the car, the man arrives, making up a story that Jessica is his sister and she's having a psychotic episode. After some back and forth, Robert demands to use the man's phone to call the police. The man holds out his phone to Robert and as he reaches out for it, the man catches Robert off guard and begins to beat him. Jessica flees on foot while the man kills Robert with his rifle.

The chase continues, the man now armed with Robert's hunting rifle. Jessica hides in a cave at night to get out of the rain, but the man spots her and shoots her in the shoulder. She hides in a small pond. The man tries to goad her into coming out by talking about her husband's suicide but gives up and leaves when she doesn't come out.

The next day, while the man is disposing of Robert's body, Jessica climbs into his car. While looking for the car keys, she finds the man's phone. She steals it and climbs into the trunk as the man returns to the vehicle. While he is driving, Jessica dials 911 and tries to whisper to the operator what has happened to her but ultimately hangs up when the operator can't hear her.

The man sees that his phone is missing and stops the car. After looking for his phone, he realizes that she is in the trunk. Armed with a tire iron, Jessica leaps into the backseat and attacks, striking him in the head multiple times. The man starts driving and uses his hunting knife to attack Jessica, but she wrestles the knife away from him and stabs his arm. The man crashes the car, flipping it over.

Dazed, Jessica climbs out and spots a search and rescue helicopter. She runs after it into a clearing. She uses the man's phone to call his wife and she tells her that her husband is not on a business trip, that he is trying to kill her, and that he has murdered Robert. The man, whose name has been revealed as Sam, follows Jessica into the clearing. Jessica puts the phone on speaker and taunts Sam with it. Enraged that Jessica has exposed his true nature to his family, Sam hangs up the phone and, armed with the hunting knife, fights with Jessica, who is armed with the tire iron. After one final fight, Jessica ultimately wins and fatally stabs Sam, and watches him with satisfaction as he dies. As she lies exhausted, the helicopter descends from above.

Cast 
 Jules Willcox as Jessica Swanson
 Marc Menchaca as The Man A.K.A Sam
 Anthony Heald as Robert

Production 
In December 2017, it was announced that Jules Willcox would star in the film. The film is a remake of Olsson's 2011 Swedish film Gone.

Reception

Box office and VOD 
Alone was released in the United States on September 18, 2020 in theaters and on video-on-demand. It grossed $182,473 from 173 theaters in its opening weekend. It was also the most rented film on Google Play, fourth on FandangoNow, and ninth on Apple TV. In its second weekend the film ranked third at Google Play, fourth at FandangoNow, and sixth at Apple TV, then its third weekend finished second at Google Play, third at FandangoNow, eighth at AppleTV, and tenth at Spectrum.

Critical response 
{{Rotten Tomatoes prose|90|6.9||Alone'''s minimalistic approach makes this heightened thriller a gripping and suspenseful experience.|ref=yes|access-date=}} On Metacritic, the film has a weighted average score of 70 out of 100 based on nine critics, indicating "generally favorable reviews".

Jeannette Catsoulis of The New York Times wrote: "This minimalist survival thriller unfolds with such elegant simplicity and single-minded momentum that its irritations are easily excused." Kevin Crust of the Los Angeles Times wrote: "Top-tier performances from Jules Willcox and Marc Menchaca provide 98 minutes of heart-pounding diversion." Ignatiy Vishnevetsky of The A.V. Club gave it a B grade, writing: "there's something deeply appealing about an already stripped-down cat-and-mouse scenario that becomes dirtier and more elemental as it goes along, tracing a devolutionary arc from the rules of the road to primeval combat."

Odie Henderson of RogerEbert.com'' was more critical of the film, giving it a score of 2/4 stars and writing that it "gives us little reason to care if our hero makes it out alive, but I have to give credit where it's due: Jessica isn't written as some damsel in distress."

References

External links 
 

2020 films
2020 thriller films
2020s English-language films
American thriller films
Films about kidnapping in the United States
Films about stalking
Films shot in Oregon
Films directed by John Hyams
2020s American films
American remakes of Swedish films